A baby, or infant, is the very young offspring of human beings. Or, by extension, it can refer to a young animal.

Baby, Babies, or The Baby may also refer to:

Aircraft 
 Avro Baby, a British single-seat light sporting biplane
 Sopwith Baby, a seaplane used by the British Royal Naval Air Service from 1915
 Supermarine Baby, a British flying boat fighter aircraft of the First World War
 Wight Baby, a British seaplane fighter which first flew in 1916

Arts and entertainment

Characters 
 Baby (Dragon Ball), in the anime Dragon Ball GT
 Baby, in the Super Monkey Ball series of video games
 Baby, in the 2017 film Baby Driver, played by Ansel Elgort
 Baby Firefly,  in the Firefly film series
 Frances "Baby" Houseman, in the 1987 film Dirty Dancing, played by actress Jennifer Grey
 Baby Sinclair, in the television sitcom Dinosaurs

Films 
 Baby (1915 film), an American silent comedy starring Oliver Hardy
 Baby, a 1932 German film starring Anny Ondra
 Baby: Secret of the Lost Legend, a 1985 American film directed by Bill L. Norton
 Baby (2000 film), an American television film featuring Alison Pill
 Baby (2002 film), a German drama film
 Baby (2007 film), an American independent film starring David Huynh
 Baby (2010 film), a British short film
 Baby (2015 Tamil film), a horror film
 Baby (2015 Hindi film), an Indian action spy thriller film starring Akshay Kumar
 Baby (2016 film), an Indian Odia film
 Baby (2020 film), a Spanish psychological thriller film
 Babies (film), a 2010 documentary by Thomas Balmes
 The Baby (film), a 1973 American horror thriller film starring Anjanette Comer

Literature 
 Baby (MacLachlan novel), a 1995 novel by Patricia MacLachlan
 Baby (Thorup novel), a 1973 novel by Kirsten Thorup

Music

Labels 
 Baby Records (disambiguation), multiple record labels

Musicians 
 Baby (band), a 1970s American southern rock band from Texas
 The Babies, an American rock band formed in 2009
 The Babys, a 1970s British rock group
 Baby (rapper), American rapper Bryan Christopher Williams (born 1969), also known as Birdman

Albums 
 Baby (The Burning Hell album), 2009
 Baby (The Detroit Cobras album), 2005
 Baby (White Hinterland album) or the title song, 2014
 Baby (Yello album), 1991
 Baby, by Bosque Brown, 2009
 The Babies (album), by the Babies, 2011
 The Babys (album), by the Babys, 1977

Songs 
 "Baby" (Aitch and Ashanti song), 2022
 "Baby" (Angie Stone song), 2007
 "Baby" (Anton Powers and Pixie Lott song), 2017
 "Baby" (Ashanti song), 2002
 "Baby" (Aya Nakamura song), 2023
 "Baby" (Brandy song), 1994
 "Baby" (Charli XCX song), 2022
  "Baby" (Clean Bandit song), 2018
 "Baby" (Fabolous song), 2005
 "Baby" (Justin Bieber song), 2010
 "Baby" (LL Cool J song), 2008
 "Baby" (Madame song), 2020
 "Baby" (Pnau song), 2008
 "Baby" (Quality Control, Lil Baby and DaBaby song), 2019
 "Baby" (Royal Republic song), 2016
 "Baby" (Wilma Burgess song), 1965
 "B-A-B-Y", by Carla Thomas, 1966
 "Baby (You've Got What It Takes)", by Dinah Washington and Brook Benton, 1960
 "Baby: Drive Me Crazy", by Chantay Savage, 1996
 "Babies" (song), by Pulp, 1992
 "I Wanna Have Your Babies", first released as "Babies", by Natasha Bedingfield, 2007
 "The Baby" (song), by Blake Shelton, 2003
 "Baby", by Alcazar from Disco Defenders, 2009
 "Baby", by Bakermat, 2017
 "Baby", by the Bird and the Bee from Ray Guns Are Not Just the Future, 2009
 "Baby", by Bishop Briggs, 2018
 "Baby", by Brittany Howard from Jaime, 2019
 "Baby", by Caetano Veloso and Gal Costa from Tropicalia: ou Panis et Circenses, 1968
 "Baby", by Celine Dion from Courage, 2019
 "Baby", by Eminem from The Marshall Mathers LP 2, 2013
 "Baby", by Exo from XOXO, 2013
 "Baby", by Iggy Pop from The Idiot, 1977
 "Baby", by Joker Bra (Capital Bra) and Vize, 2020
 "Baby", by Kylie Minogue, a B-side of "Love at First Sight", 2001
 "Baby", by Logic from Supermarket, 2019
 "Baby", by Madison Beer from Life Support, 2021
 "Baby", by Martha Wainwright from Martha Wainwright, 2005
 "Baby", by Melody Club from Face the Music, 2004
 "Baby", by Nicki Nicole from Parte de Mí, 2021
 "Baby", by Prince from For You, 1978
 "Baby", by Relient K from Forget and Not Slow Down, 2009
 "Baby", by Ridsa, 2014
 "Baby", by Rufus Wainwright from Rufus Wainwright, 1998
 "Baby", by Sage the Gemini, 2021
 "Baby", by Serj Tankian from Elect the Dead, 2007
 "Baby", by Tenacious D from The Pick of Destiny, 2006
 "Babies", by Kyle from Light of Mine, 2018

Television

Series 
 Babies (TV series), a 2020 American documentary streaming series
 Baby (Italian TV series), a 2018–2020 teen drama streaming series
 Baby (Pakistani TV series), a 2017 drama series
 The Baby (TV series), an HBO horror comedy series

Episodes 
 "Baby" (The Dumping Ground)
 "Baby" (Supernatural)
 "The Baby" (Dynasty)

Other arts and entertainment 
 Babies (Černý), a series of sculptures by David Černý
 Baby (musical), a 1983 musical by David Shire and Richard Maltby, Jr.

People 
 Baby (nickname), a list of people
 Baby (surname), a list of people
 Baby Halder (born 1973), Indian writer
 Baby Huwae (1939–1989), Indonesian actress and singer
 Baby Spice, Emma Bunton (born 1976), from Spice Girls
 Baby (director), A. G. Baby, Indian film director
 Baby (rapper) or Birdman, Bryan Williams (born 1969), American rapper
 Baby, Shannon McNeill, performer with the World Championship Wrestling dance team the Nitro Girls

Places 
 Baby, Gmina Odolanów in Greater Poland Voivodeship, west-central Poland
 Baby, Gmina Ostrów Wielkopolski in Greater Poland Voivodeship, west-central Poland
 Baby, Kutno County in Łódź Voivodeship, central Poland
 Baby, Masovian Voivodeship, east-central Poland
 Baby, Piotrków County in Łódź Voivodeship, central Poland
 Baby, Seine-et-Marne, a commune of the Seine-et-Marne département, France
 Baby, Silesian Voivodeship, south Poland

Other uses 
 "Baby", a term of endearment
 Baby cell or C battery, a common size of battery
 Manchester Baby, the first electronic stored-program computer
 Baby! 1, an early portable microcomputer

See also 
 
 
 Baby, Baby (disambiguation)
 DaBaby, American rapper Jonathan Lyndale Kirk (born 1991)
 Babe (disambiguation)
 Babes (disambiguation)
 Babies (disambiguation)